Lesley Kaitlyn Lawes (born December 16, 1988) is a Canadian curler. Lawes was the long time third for the Jennifer Jones team that represented Canada at the 2014 Winter Olympics where they won the gold medal. They were the first women's team to go through the Olympics undefeated and the first Manitoba based curling team to win at the Olympics. Lawes curled with John Morris in the mixed doubles event at the 2018 Winter Olympics where they won gold. This win made her and Morris the first Canadian curlers to win two Olympic gold medals, and Lawes was the first to win gold in two consecutive Olympics.

Lawes was a member of the world champion team as a third at the 2018 Ford World Women's Curling Championship, where the team went through the event undefeated. She also won a silver medal at the 2015 World Championships. Lawes was a winner of the 2015 Scotties Tournament of Hearts and has had two runner-up results at the Scotties in 2011 and 2013. Lawes is a two-time Canadian junior champion (2008, 2009) and went on to win a silver and bronze medal each at the World Junior Curling Championships.

In 2019, Lawes was named the seventh greatest Canadian curler in history in a TSN poll of broadcasters, reporters and top curlers.

Curling career

Juniors
Lawes began curling at the age of four.

Lawes first came into the spotlight in 2008 when she won the Manitoba Junior women's championship with teammates Jenna Loder, Liz Peters and Sarah Wazney. With Lawes skipping the team, the rink represented Manitoba at the 2008 Canadian Junior Curling Championships, where she led her team to a 10–2 round robin record, in first place. In the finals, her team beat Saskatchewan's Stephanie McVicar rink, claiming the national championship. This qualified her team to represent Canada at the 2008 World Junior Curling Championships. There, she led Canada to a 5–4 round robin record, tied with Denmark's Madeleine Dupont team. She would go on to beat Denmark, but lose in the 3 vs. 4 playoff game against Russia's Liudmila Privivkova. This put her team into the bronze medal game, where she would face-off against Russia again. This time her rink got the best of the Russians, beating them 9–8, and taking home the bronze medal in the process.

2009 was another great season for the Lawes team. They once again won the Manitoba junior championship, with a new front-end of Laryssa Grenkow and Breanne Meakin replacing Peters and Wazney. At the 2009 Canadian Junior Curling Championships, Lawes led Manitoba to an 8–4 round robin record, in third place. In the playoffs, however, they downed Alberta's Casey Scheidegger rink and Ontario's Rachel Homan to defend their title and once again represented Canada at the World Juniors. At the 2009 World Junior Curling Championships, Lawes would lead Team Canada to a 6–3 round robin record, in third place. In the playoffs, she beat the Russians (skipped by Margarita Fomina) and Switzerland (skipped by Martina Baumann) before losing to Scotland's Eve Muirhead in the gold medal final, settling for silver. In addition to their great showing in junior competitions, the Lawes team also played well on the World Curling Tour, making the semi-finals in a Grand Slam event, the Casinos of Winnipeg Women's Curling Classic.

Early women's career (2009–2013)
After Juniors, Lawes teamed up to play third for Cathy King who was needing a third after Lori Olson left the team to play for Crystal Webster. In her one season with the King rink, Lawes would win the September Shoot-Out, and played in three Grand Slams, making it to the semifinals of the 2009 Trail Appliances Curling Classic. The team played in the 2010 Alberta Scotties Tournament of Hearts, where they would finish in third place.

Following the 2009–10 curling season, Team King decided to step back from the game for a while, leaving Lawes without a team to play for. Shortly after, it was announced that Team Jennifer Jones had dropped third Cathy Overton-Clapham, and had replaced her with Lawes, in time for the 2010–11 curling season.  The team found immediate success in their first season together, winning two slams (the 2010 Sobeys Slam and the 2011 Players' Championship), as well as the Sun Life Classic, the Karuizawa International Curling Championship and the Victoria Curling Classic Invitational events on the World Curling Tour. As Jones had won the 2010 Scotties Tournament of Hearts, the team represented Team Canada at the 2011 Scotties Tournament of Hearts, Lawes' first women's national championship. There they would make it to the finals, where they lost to Saskatchewan's Amber Holland rink.

The Jones rink continued their success into the 2011–12 season, winning the Radisson Blu Oslo Cup and the 2011 Canada Cup of Curling. The team won the 2012 Manitoba Scotties Tournament of Hearts and represented Manitoba at the 2012 Scotties Tournament of Hearts. There, they would win the bronze medal.

For the first half of the 2012–13 season, Lawes skipped the team, with Kirsten Wall throwing third, as Jones was expecting her first child and sat out until January. Lawes won The Shoot-Out event on the World Curling Tour as skip. As skip, she would play in four slams, failing to qualify at the 2012 Curlers Corner Autumn Gold Curling Classic and the 2012 Masters, making it to the quarterfinals of the 2012 Manitoba Lotteries Women's Curling Classic and the round of 16 at the 2012 Colonial Square Ladies Classic. Lawes skipped the team at the 2012 Canada Cup of Curling, where she would lose in the final to Team Stefanie Lawton.  Jones was back to skipping the team in time for the 2013 Manitoba Scotties Tournament of Hearts, which they again would win.  At the 2013 Scotties Tournament of Hearts, Jones led Manitoba to another silver medal, this time losing to Ontario's Rachel Homan rink in the final.

Olympic and Scotties success (2013–2017)
The Jones team won the right to compete at the 2014 Winter Olympics when they won the 2013 Canadian Olympic Curling Trials. At the Olympics the team became the first women's team to not only go through the round robin undefeated but also the first team to go throughout the whole tournament undefeated when they won the Olympic gold. They were the first Manitoba based curling team to win gold at the Olympics. After the win Lawes noted her recently deceased father stating "I know he would be so proud. This is something he knew we had it in us. I don't know how to describe it. I thought about him a lot during the game ... I wish that I could share this experience with him, but he was my inspiration." In addition to their Olympic win, the team won three Grand Slams on the World Curling Tour, winning the 2013 Manitoba Liquor & Lotteries Women's Classic, the 2013 Colonial Square Ladies Classic and the 2014 Players' Championship.

Following the Olympics in Russia, Lawes as part of the Jones' team won the 2015 Manitoba Scotties Tournament of Hearts, and then won the 2015 Scotties Tournament of Hearts in Moose Jaw, Lawes' first national women's title. The team would represent Canada at the 2015 World Women's Curling Championship, where they made the final but lost to Alina Pätz of Switzerland 5–3, finishing in the silver medal position. On the tour, the team would win the 2014 Curlers Corner Autumn Gold Curling Classic, the Canad Inns Women's Classic and the Karuizawa International Curling Championship.

By virtue of winning the 2015 Scotties, the Jones rink would represent Team Canada at the 2016 Scotties Tournament of Hearts, where they would win a bronze medal. On the Tour that season, the team would only win the DeKalb Superspiel, and the season-ending Grand Slam event, the 2016 Humpty's Champions Cup.

The Jones rink would not qualify for the 2017 Scotties, having lost in the semifinals of the 2017 Manitoba Scotties Tournament of Hearts. However, they had some success in other events, winning the DeKalb Superspiel again, winning the 2016 Canada Cup of Curling and the 2017 Players' Championship.

2018 mixed doubles Olympic champion and world champion
Lawes next tried to qualify for the 2018 Winter Olympics in Pyeongchang, Korea but the team did not succeed, watching the Rachel Homan rink win the honour. She would still have an opportunity to qualify for the Olympics as part of the debut mixed doubles curling event. John Morris was scheduled to curl with Homan in the trials, but she was unavailable having already qualified as Canada's women's representative.  Morris then teamed up with Lawes; the pair only practiced once at the Granite Curling Club for 30 minutes prior to the 2018 Canadian Mixed Doubles Curling Olympic Trials. They would finish the round robin 5–3 but won through the playoff round to the final where they defeated Brad Gushue and Valerie Sweeting, winning the right to wear the maple leaf in Korea.

The team entered the Mixed Doubles competition against Norway, but lost their opening game. Lawes and Morris would go on to win their next six games, finishing with a 6–1 record. In the semifinals they faced Norway in a rematch, this time prevailing. In the gold medal final they routed the Swiss team 10–3, with the Swiss team conceding after six ends. Lawes thanked supporters from home for her gold medal win, telling CBC News:  "Everyone in Winnipeg, thank you so much for your support, and St. Vital Curling Club for helping our families come to cheer us on. We felt that support so much over here." After her win a landmark 'Winnipeg' sign at The Forks was lit up in gold and red to celebrate her medal win.   Lawes and Morris were Canada's first two-time Olympic champions in curling, and Lawes the first Canadian to win gold in curling in two consecutive Olympics.

Following her return from South Korea, Lawes joined the Jones team and took her spot at third back from Shannon Birchard who had played at this position in her absence. The team, victorious with Birchard at the 2018 Scotties Tournament of Hearts won the right to wear the maple leaf at the 2018 Ford World Women's Curling Championship taking place in North Bay, Ontario. The team played very well and went through the round-robin undefeated. They would eventually beat Jamie Sinclair and her American team in the semi-final earning the right to face the Olympic champion, Anna Hasselborg in the final. Lawes and the Jones team would have to take Hasselborg to an extra end, but ultimately won the game without having to throw their last rock. The victory was Lawes's first World Championship victory and would be the last for long-time second Jill Officer, as she announced she was stepping back from the game.

Jocelyn Peterman joins the team (2018–present)
In the 2018-19 curling season, Jocelyn Peterman joined the Jones team at second, replacing Officer. Lawes and the team won the 2018 Canada Cup with an 8–5 victory over Kerri Einarson. The team also won the 2019 TSN All-Star Curling Skins Game, defeating Tracy Fleury to win $51,000. The team represented Team Canada at the 2019 Scotties Tournament of Hearts, missing playoffs with a 6–5 record. The team of Jones, Lawes, Shannon Birchard, and Officer was chosen to represent Team Canada at the Grand Final of the inaugural Curling World Cup, which they won, defeating Silvana Tirinzoni in the final. Lawes played in two mixed doubles events that season with Morris, the Canad Inns Mixed Doubles Championship, which they won, and the Qualico Mixed Doubles Classic, where they lost in the quarterfinal to Peterman and Brett Gallant. However, she was unable to compete in the 2019 Canadian Mixed Doubles Curling Championship after sustaining an injury at the Scotties.

In their first event of the 2019-20 season, Team Jones won the 2019 AMJ Campbell Shorty Jenkins Classic, defeating Tracy Fleury in the final. Next they played in the 2019 Colonial Square Ladies Classic where Fleury would take them out in the semi-finals. They had two quarterfinal finishes at the first two Slams of the season, the Masters and the Tour Challenge. At the Canada Cup, the team struggled, finishing with a 2–4 record. The team made the final at the Boost National, losing to Team Hasselborg, and the quarterfinals at the Canadian Open. The team made the final of the 2020 Manitoba Scotties Tournament of Hearts and lost to Team Einarson. By virtue of their CTRS ranking, the team had a second chance to qualify for the 2020 Scotties Tournament of Hearts through the wild card play-in game, where they defeated Team Fleury to become Team Wild Card. At the Scotties, they finished the round robin and championship pool with a 9–2 record as the second seed in playoffs, but lost to Kerri Einarson (Team Manitoba) in the 1 vs. 2 playoff game and to Rachel Homan (Team Ontario) in the semifinal to finish in third place. It would be their last event of the season as both the Players' Championship and the Champions Cup Grand Slam events were also cancelled due to the COVID-19 pandemic. On March 18, 2020, the team announced that Lisa Weagle, after parting ways with Team Homan, would join the team in a 5-player rotation.

The Jones rink won their lone event of the abbreviated 2020–21 season at the 2020 Stu Sells Oakville Tankard. The 2021 Manitoba Scotties were cancelled due to the COVID-19 pandemic in Manitoba, so Curl Manitoba appointed the Jones rink to represent Manitoba at the 2021 Scotties Tournament of Hearts. At the 2021 Hearts, the team finished with a 9–3 record, putting them in a third place tiebreaker match against Alberta, skipped by Laura Walker. Alberta defeated Manitoba 9–8 to advance to the semifinal. A month later, Lawes returned to the bubble to compete with her nephew Connor Lawes at the 2021 Canadian Mixed Doubles Curling Championship. The pair failed to make the playoffs, finishing pool play with a 1–5 record. Lawes ended her season with Team Jones at the only two Grand Slam events of the abbreviated season, also held in the Calgary bubble. The team missed the playoffs at both the 2021 Champions Cup and the 2021 Players' Championship.

Team Jones qualified for the playoffs in each of their first four tour events, however, were not able to qualify for any finals. At the first Grand Slam of the season, the 2021 Masters, the team was able to reach the final before losing to Tracy Fleury in a 9–7 match. They then missed the playoffs at the 2021 National two weeks later.

A month later, Team Jones competed in the 2021 Canadian Olympic Curling Trials. There, the team posted a 5–3 round robin record, earning a spot in the semifinal. They then defeated Krista McCarville to qualify for the final where they would once again face Fleury. After a tight game all the way through, Team Fleury stole one in the ninth end to take a single point lead. In the tenth end, Jones had an open hit-and-stick to win the game, however, her shooter rolled two far and she only got one. This sent the game to an extra end. On her final shot, Fleury attempted a soft-weight hit on a Jones stone partially buried behind a guard. Her rock, however, curled too much and hit the guard, giving up a steal of one and the game to Team Jones. After the game, Jones said that "We're there to pick each other up when you miss, not everybody can say that and that's really a big strength of our team." With the win, Team Jones travelled to Beijing, China to represent Canada at the 2022 Winter Olympics. Through the round robin, the Canadian team had mixed results, ultimately finishing tied for third with a 5–4 record. However, because of their draw shot challenge results, which were the lowest of the teams they were tied with, they ranked fifth overall, missing the playoffs. After their final game, an emotional Lawes said that "It's difficult when it's out of our control. I'm really proud of this team. We worked really hard this week and we have a lot to be proud of. At the end of the day we tried our best and that's all we could do."

On March 15, 2022, Team Jones announced that they would be parting ways at the conclusion of the 2021–22 season. Lawes and second Jocelyn Peterman then announced they would be joining Selena Njegovan and Kristin MacCuish of Team Fleury to form a new team for the 2022–23 season. Lawes would skip the team, with Njegovan playing third, Peterman at second and MacCuish at lead.

Team Jones still had two more events together before parting ways, the 2022 Players' Championship and 2022 Champions Cup Grand Slams. At the Players', the team went 1–3, missing the playoffs. They then missed the playoffs again at the Champions Cup with a 1–4 record, ending the team's run together.

Personal life
Lawes attended the University of Manitoba where she studied nutrition, and is currently attending Athabasca University where she is studying communications.  She is in engaged to Stephan Vigier, a professional ice hockey player. Her father Keith was also a competitive curler, having played for Newfoundland at the 1969 Macdonald Brier. Her half sister is Andrea Lawes, who was a member of the 1990 Scott Tournament of Hearts champion team, representing Ontario. Her nephew is curler Connor Lawes. Her mother is Cheryl Lawes and her brother is Kevin Lawes.

Grand Slam record

Former events

Year-by-year statistics

Team events

Mixed doubles

Teams

Notes

References

External links

Living people
Curlers from Alberta
Curlers from Winnipeg
1988 births
Canadian women curlers
Curlers at the 2014 Winter Olympics
Curlers at the 2018 Winter Olympics
Olympic curlers of Canada
Olympic gold medalists for Canada
Olympic medalists in curling
Medalists at the 2014 Winter Olympics
Medalists at the 2018 Winter Olympics
Canadian women's curling champions
Continental Cup of Curling participants
University of Manitoba alumni
World curling champions
Canada Cup (curling) participants
Curlers at the 2022 Winter Olympics
Athabasca University alumni